Heimdall is a fictional character appearing in American comic books published by Marvel Comics. The character is based on the Norse deity Heimdall. Heimdall is described as all-seeing and all-hearing and is the sole protector of the Bifröst in Asgard.

Idris Elba portrayed the character in the Marvel Cinematic Universe films Thor (2011), Thor: The Dark World (2013), Avengers: Age of Ultron (2015), Thor: Ragnarok (2017), Avengers: Infinity War (2018), and Thor: Love and Thunder (2022).

Publication history

Heimdall first appeared in a comic in Journey into Mystery #85 (October 1962) and was created by Stan Lee, Larry Lieber and Jack Kirby.

Fictional character biography
Heimdall is the brother of the warrior Sif. He is the all-seeing and all-hearing guardian sentry of Asgard who stands on the rainbow bridge Bifröst to watch for any attacks to Asgard. He partly won the role through using his eyesight to see an army of giants several days' march from Asgard, allowing them to be defeated before they reached Asgard, and making their king a prisoner. For ages, he stood as the guardian of Asgard, defending the city's gates from any intruders, and was one of the most trusted servants of Odin.

In his first appearance, Loki had been imprisoned in a tree until his plight caused someone to shed a tear. Heimdall accidentally freed him when Loki caused one of the leaves of the tree to poke him in the eye. Later Heimdall warned Odin of a threat he had perceived though he did not know exactly what manner of danger it was. Odin wove his own magic and found a Vanna, a wind sprite that was one of the few entities able to physically elude Heimdall. Odin praised Heimdall's courage for warning the others, even though he knew not what he was warning about and thus risking ridicule. When next seen, he battled Thor to prevent him from entering Asgard; He then battled Thor to prevent him from leaving Asgard as Odin did not want him to see Jane Foster again. Heimdall was then immobilized by Seidring in a cuboid of ethereal force when Seidring stole the Odinforce. Some time later, he encountered the Recorder during the attack of the superstrong monster Mangog.

Later still, Heimdall battled Thor at Loki's command. In the prophecy of Ragnarok, he severed the Rainbow Bridge, and sounded Gjallarhorn. He traveled to Earth with Kamorr the dwarf to search for human candidates for godhood. He gathered three such human beings, and arranged for them to be exposed to Ego-Prime's energies and become the first three Young Gods. Heimdall then accompanied the Asgardians into the Dark Nebula.

Heimdall later became afflicted by lethargy in one of Odin's absences from Asgard. He then blew Gjallarhorn to summon Odin's elite guard. Some time later, he summoned Asgardian troops to restrain Thor. Later, he battled Thor again to prevent him from bringing mortals into Asgard.

When Asgard was invaded by the fire demon Surtur, Heimdall attempted to defend the gates, but was overcome, and the Rainbow Bridge was shattered. No longer needing to be stationary, Heimdall spent more time in Asgard. Heimdall is given the Great Scepter of Odin to guard by Loki. Heimdall discovered Malekith's escape. He fetched Amora the Enchantress to help free Thor from ensorcelment. Heimdall later learned of Loki's possession of Surtur's sword.

Heimdall became close to Amora, who was soon infatuated with him. He comforted Amora about the Executioner's death. Heimdall rescued Balder from Seth's assassins. Heimdall was gravely injured during the war with Seth, the Egyptian god of death, when he was struck down in battle with the legions of Seth. Heimdall later battled Sif, Leir and Caber. Heimdall confronted Surtur disguised as Odin about the imprisoned Grand Vizier. Heimdall led the legions of Asgard into battle against Ymir.

When Odin returned to Asgard after Surtur's defeat, he gave a portion of his power to Heimdall to restore the Rainbow Bridge, and Heimdall resumed his duties.

Seemingly betrayed
Shortly afterwards, when Odin was about to enter his Odinsleep, he passed the Odinpower on to Heimdall to rule Asgard until he awoke. Heimdall had to deal with a major crisis in the life of Thor, as Thor had been banished into the subconscious of the mortal Eric Masterson, who had assumed Thor's responsibilities. Sif was determined to find the real Thor, and her determination drove a wedge between her and Heimdall. When Karnilla conspired with Loki to rule Asgard by having Odin awaken with Loki's soul possessing him, Heimdall was branded a traitor and banished to the Dream Dimension, ruled by the demon Nightmare. During this incident, his mind had been altered, leaving him little more than being able to follow directions. The Enchantress battles Nightmare in order to save him, ultimately rescuing them both. Eric Masterson helped restore Odin whose body had been taken over by Loki with Mephisto's help and later Thor as well from the soul shroud.

Loss and death
Heimdall and Amora drifted apart when Amora realized that his duty to Asgard was greater than his love for her. When Odin cast the Asgardians into the guises of mortals to protect them from a false Ragnarok, Heimdall became Donald Velez. He joined the other "Lost Gods" in attempting to rediscover who they were and battling the Egyptian death-god Seth. Heimdall and the others regained their true forms and defeated Seth just as Asgard was attacked by the Dark Gods, and they were all taken prisoner. They were finally rescued by Thor.

Around this time, Jason, a powerful member of the earth-based team the Pantheon, claims to have eluded Heimdall's senses during a trip through Asgard and over the Rainbow Bridge. Not many people trust Jason.

An alternate reality version of Asgard featured the realm itself floating over the East Coast of America. This raises worship of Thor, who was the ruler and he utilizes Heimdall's senses to hear the prayers directed to him. This realm is eliminated from time when the future Thor realizes he has become a tyrant and merges with his past self.

Asgard is struck by another Ragnarok, caused by Loki making weapons like Mjolnir for his army and enlisting the aid of Surtur, one from which there was no seeming reversal. Heimdall perishes in battle defending his people. Many Asgardians, Heimdall included, reform as Earthly beings.

Rebirth
After Thor ends the cycle of Ragnarok, Thor restores Asgard in Broxton, Oklahoma. Heimdall, along with the other Asgardians, are reborn on Earth in bodies of mortal beings, and he is the first Asgardian to be found. Thor locates Heimdall in New Orleans in the body of a man on a bridge and restores him to his Asgardian form. Upon his return to Asgard, Heimdall uses his near-omniscient power to locate the scattered souls of the other Asgardians with the notable exception of his sister Sif, due to Loki's interference.

Heimdall is overcome by guilt when his supervision of all known worlds, including Earth, fails to spot the Fenris wolf savaging a small town in the state of Washington. Thor assures him that no Asgardian is perfect, and that furthermore he should assuage his guilt by performing his job better in the future.

During the events of Siege, Heimdall is one of the first targets to be taken out by Norman Osborn and his forces. Loki transports his bedchamber beneath Asgard so he cannot warn them of the attack. However Heimdall partially recovers, joins his comrades in battle and assists in defeating the invaders. Heimdall's duties and status are touched upon in the 'Avengers Prime' miniseries which takes place in the days following 'Siege'. At the conclusion, he is entrusted with the 'Twilight Sword', a weapon that could destroy the known worlds.

All-Mother

The rebuilding of Asgard comes with a new ruler, the All-Mother. She asks Heimdall to look into the future, where he sees unknown assassins attempting to kill her. He also manages to note something is wrong with the God of Thunder, Tanarus. This Thunder God severely injures Heimdall, leaving him unable to protect the All-Mother and warn others of the mystery of his attacker.

Odin returns, and yet another carries Mjolnir, Jane Foster. When Odin sends Cul to bring down Jane on Bifrost itself, Heimdall fights back, knowing this would end with him imprisoned, as the former All-Mother is now imprisoned under Odin's orders.

Blinded Heimdall
When Mangog attacked Asgard, his latest assault left Heimdall blind when the monster took Heimdall's sword and used it to gouge out his eyes. Heimdall was treated in time to save his life, but when the War of the Realms began, he was still blinded, with the result that Daredevil took over his duties for a brief period as he was better equipped to 'see' while blind, until his eyes recovered.

Death
With his eyesight restored, Heimdall traveled to Midgard to help Jane Foster - the new Valkyrie - find the lost sword Dragonfang, but was stabbed in the chest by Bullseye after the assassin took the sword. Although his wounds proved fatal, Heimdall was able to help Jane accept that she had to be her own kind of Valkyrie rather than hold on to their legacy, destroying the sword to defeat Bullseye, subsequently taking Heimdall on a 'tour' of the multiversal afterlife rather than just taking him straight to Valhalla so that he could experience something truly new.

Powers and abilities
Heimdall possesses the powers of a typical Asgardian, including superhuman strength, stamina, speed, agility and durability. However, he is generally stronger and more durable than all but a few Asgardians, such as Odin and Thor. Like all Asgardians his body is three times more dense and heavy than a human's, contributing partly to his superhuman strength and weight.

Heimdall possesses extraordinarily acute superhuman senses, most notably his vision and hearing. His senses are said to be so acute that he could hear sap running through trees, and "the tiniest plant growing in the heart of the hidden hills", and see and hear anything occurring in Asgard or on Earth. Heimdall can also "look across time, as well as space", in one instance seeing the far-off approach of an invading party and correctly predicting that they were still a full two days away from Asgard; this ability to see what has yet to come is retained even after the establishment of the new Asgard on Earth. Heimdall has been said to be capable of detecting the fluttering of a butterfly's wings "a thousand worlds away". Heimdall is able to sense the life essences of Asgardian gods throughout the Nine Worlds of Asgard, and has the ability to focus on certain sensory information or block it out of his consciousness as he chooses, being so alert that he requires no sleep at all. According to Ares in his War Plan for the Siege of Asgard, Heimdall can "see and hear as far as creation", even capable of seeing the Dark Avengers at Avengers Tower from Broxton. Certain magical spells can block his sensory powers. Additionally, his powers of sight are limited if even one of his eyes cannot see; apparently his eyes are capable of sustaining physical injury and require a long time to naturally heal, if ever. At least once, Heimdall has shown the ability to project an avatar (as an enlarged image of his face) to others from just outside Broxton to Manhattan, as he did with Thor, though he claims that he cannot maintain it for long, as his power has diminished with the fall of Asgard.

Heimdall also briefly possessed the Odinpower which granted him the ability to channel vast magical energies, for various purposes, such as repairing the shattered dimension-linking Rainbow Bridge.

Heimdall is an experienced warrior and a fierce hand-to-hand combatant. He has proficiency and great experience with edged weapons and wields a variety of swords, shields and spears and he wears a suit of armor. Heimdall bore the Gjallerhorn ("Yelling Horn"), which he would sound to alert all of Asgard to dangers threatening the city's gates, functioning even on Midgard and capable of being heard by any and all Asgardians on the planet when sounded. While in the mortal form of Donald Velez he wore enchanted glasses which granted him super-enhanced vision. He possesses the golden-maned steed named Golltoppr ("Golden Top").

Heimdall is armed with an enchanted uru sword that has, on at least one occasion, allowed him to mystically disguise himself as a normal human while on Earth. It is said by Heimdall to contain "all the cosmic force of the universe" has also been shown capable of projecting "the blue flame from countless cosmic suns", used both times to battle Thor, and enabled Heimdall to directly best the Thunder God the first time when the latter's strength was halved. Heimdall has also at least once wielded the powerful Sabre of Sorcery, which projected blasts of mystic energy and/or fire, against the Hulk when the latter was invading Asgard, but was unable to prevent him from entering the Realm Eternal.

Other versions

Earth X
In the alternate Earth X reality, the Asgardians were actually aliens that were manipulated by the Celestials into believing they were the Gods of Norse myth. When the lie was revealed, "Heimdall" and the other Asgardians briefly resumed their alien form, but later returned to their Asgardian forms.

Guardians of the Galaxy
In the Guardians of the Galaxy timeline, Heimdall is still alive and well in the 31st Century. He battled Starhawk and Aleta on the Bifrost Bridge.

Thor: The Mighty Avenger
In Thor: The Mighty Avenger #6, Heimdall, much like his Marvel Universe incarnation, appears as the guard of the Bifrost bridge, sports a goatee and wears a horned helmet that casts his eyes in shadows. Heimdall is ordered by Odin to keep Thor from returning to Asgard. He is also revealed as the one who separated Thor from his hammer. When Heimdall threatens to send Jane Foster to some distant planet where Thor could never find her if he continues trying to force his way into Asgard, Thor ends his attempt.

Ultimate Marvel
Heimdall first appeared in the Ultimate Marvel universe when he is confronted by Loki (disguised as Baron Zemo), who shot and killed him. He was guarding the Bifrost.

In other media

Television
 Heimdall appears in The Super Hero Squad Show, voiced by Steve Blum in season one and by Jess Harnell in season two.
 Heimdall appears in The Avengers: Earth's Mightiest Heroes, voiced by JB Blanc.
 Heimdall appears in Avengers Assemble, voiced by James C. Mathis III (in seasons one and two), and later by Kevin Michael Richardson (in Avengers: Secret Wars). This version is based on the Marvel Cinematic Universe version. Following minor appearances in the episodes "Planet Doom" and "Back to the Learning Hall", Thor and Black Widow meet Heimdall in the episode "Widow's Run" to store the Infinity Gems at Asgard. However, Black Widow has a vision of Heimdall giving in to the gems' influence and ruling Asgard. As Heimdall tries to take the gems by force, Thor knocks him out.
 Heimdall appears in the Hulk and the Agents of S.M.A.S.H. episode "For Asgard", voiced by Chris Bosh.
 Heimdall appears in the Guardians of the Galaxy episodes "We Are the World Tree" and "Asgard War Part One: Lightning Strikes", voiced again by Kevin Michael Richardson.

Film
 Heimdall appears in a non-speaking cameo in the "Hulk vs Thor" segment of Hulk Vs.

 Heimdall appears in films set in the Marvel Cinematic Universe, portrayed by Idris Elba.  He first appears in the live-action film Thor, before returning in Thor: The Dark World, Avengers: Age of Ultron, Thor: Ragnarok, Avengers: Infinity War, and Thor: Love and Thunder in a post-credits scene cameo. Additionally, an alternate timeline version of Heimdall makes a non-speaking appearance in the Disney+ animated series What If...? episode "What If... Thor Were an Only Child?".

Video games
 Heimdall appears in Marvel: Ultimate Alliance, voiced by Cam Clarke.
 Heimdall appears in Marvel Super Hero Squad, voiced by Steve Blum.
 Heimdall makes a cameo in Thor's ending in Marvel vs Capcom 3: Fate of Two Worlds.
 The MCU version of Heimdall appears in Thor: God of Thunder, voiced by Phil LaMarr.
 Heimdall appears in Marvel: Avengers Alliance.
 Heimdall appears in Marvel Heroes.
 Heimdall appears in Lego Marvel Super Heroes, voiced by JB Blanc.
 Heimdall appears as a playable character in Lego Marvel's Avengers.
 Heimdall appears as a playable character in Marvel: Future Fight.
 Heimdall appears as a playable character in Marvel Avengers Academy.
 Heimdall appears in Lego Marvel Super Heroes 2, voiced by Colin McFarlane.

References

External links
 
 Heimdall at ImmortalThor.net
 

Characters created by Jack Kirby
Characters created by Larry Lieber
Characters created by Stan Lee
Comics characters introduced in 1962
Fictional characters with superhuman durability or invulnerability
Fictional gods
Fictional swordfighters in comics
Marvel Comics Asgardians
Marvel Comics characters who can move at superhuman speeds
Marvel Comics characters who can teleport
Marvel Comics characters who use magic
Marvel Comics characters with accelerated healing
Marvel Comics characters with superhuman senses
Marvel Comics characters with superhuman strength